Federation Island is an artificial island archipelago that was projected to be located off the coast of Sochi, Russia, in the Black Sea.

History
The archipelago complex plans were designed by Erick van Egeraat. The island would have been built in the shape of Russia. It would have contained residences, hotels, cultural, leisure and recreational facilities. The $6.2 billion project was announced at the International Investment Forum 2007 and was approved by president Vladimir Putin. The project would have been developed by M-Industries of St. Petersburg in co-operation with Dutch engineering companies Witteveen & Bos and Van Oord.

The project was frozen in 2012.

References 

Artificial islands of Russia
Khostinsky City District
Sochi
Landforms of Krasnodar Krai